Mr. Robot is an American drama–thriller television series created by Sam Esmail. It stars Rami Malek as Elliot Alderson, a cybersecurity engineer and hacker who has social anxiety disorder and clinical depression. Alderson is recruited by an insurrectionary anarchist known as "Mr. Robot", played by Christian Slater, to join a group of hacktivists. The group aims to cancel all debts by attacking the large conglomerate E Corp.

The pilot premiered on multiple online and video on demand services on May 27, 2015.

Series overview

Episodes

Season 1 (2015)
First-season episode titles have a suffix corresponding to a type of digital container format.

Season 2 (2016)
Second-season episode titles have a suffix corresponding to a type of encryption.

Season 3 (2017)
Third-season episode titles are in the form of coding library files, compressed archives and a torrent file, while the season finale title is in the form of a computer command ("shutdown -r").

Season 4 (2019)
The first ten episode titles are HTTP status codes in the 4xx range.

Notes

Specials

Supplementary content
In June 2016, USA Network announced Hacking Robot, a live aftershow hosted by Andy Greenwald. The first episode of Hacking Robot debuted after the season two premiere, with guests Sam Esmail, Rami Malek, Christian Slater, Carly Chaikin and Portia Doubleday and received 376,000 viewers. The second installment aired on September 7, 2016, after the tenth episode of the second season, and received 320,000 viewers.

In addition, a weekly web-only aftershow titled Mr. Robot Digital After Show premiered on The Verge and USA Network's websites after the third episode.

Ratings

Overview

Season 1
The first episode of Mr. Robot was released across multiple digital platforms in advance of its first broadcast. It had a viewership of 2.7 million prior to the first broadcast of the episode.

Season 2

Season 3

Season 4

References

External links
 
 

Lists of American drama television series episodes